Anthonomus pomorum or the apple blossom weevil is a univoltine herbivore of apple trees, Malus domestica.

Life history 
Adults generally overwinter in leaf litter of forests or hedgerows. In the spring, they emigrate to orchards and colonize apple trees.  They may find their host trees using pheromones or plant-derived chemical cues.

Spiders can be effective predators of A. pomorum.

References

Curculioninae
Agricultural pest insects
Apple tree diseases
Beetles of Asia
Beetles described in 1758
Taxa named by Carl Linnaeus